Matthew Redman may refer to:

Mathew de Redman (fl.1294-1307), MP for Lancashire
Matt Redman, English Christian worship leader, songwriter and author